J. David Simons (born 27 August 1953) is a Scottish novelist and short story writer.  He was educated at Hutchesons' Boys Grammar School and graduated with a law degree from Glasgow University in 1973. He has been a partner with an Edinburgh law firm, a cotton farmer on Kibbutz Ashdot Ya'akov Ichud in Israel, a charity administrator for the Cyrenians  in West London, a university lecturer at Keio University, Japan, and a journalist for multi-national publishing house Informa.

Apart from his fiction writing, Simons is also an editor with the Blue Pencil literary agency and a media journalist with the global technology consultancy firm, Omdia (formerly Ovum). Since October 2017, he has lived as a digital nomad  – travelling, writing and working around the world.

Literary career 
Simons' first novel, The Credit Draper, was published by Two Ravens Press in May 2008, and was shortlisted for the McKitterick Prize in June 2009. This novel is set primarily within the Glasgow Jewish Community in the early part of the 20th century, and represents the first part of his "Glasgow to Galilee" trilogy. Simons goes on to tackle issues of socialism, feminism and birth control in Glasgow during the 1920s in his second novel in this trilogy, The Liberation of Celia Kahn, which was published by Five Leaves Publications in February 2011, along with a re-print of The Credit Draper. His third novel, An Exquisite Sense of What is Beautiful, set in Japan, was published by Saraband in March 2013, and examines the theme of denial, especially in regard to the dropping of the atomic bombs on Hiroshima and Nagasaki by the United States.

In The Land Agent, the third novel in the "Glasgow to Galilee" trilogy, published by Saraband in October 2014, Simons turns his attention to 1920s Palestine and the conflict over a strategic piece of land that does not exist on any map. Simons' fifth novel, A Woman of Integrity, was originally published in March 2017 by Freight, before its rights were acquired by Saraband. The novel deals with the lives of two film actresses from different eras trying to carve out careers for themselves away from the shadows of men. In his most recent novel, The Responsibility of Love published by BackPage Press  Simons explores the theme as to whether a person is forever responsible for those he/she has tamed.

Awards and grants 
Robert Louis Stevenson Fellowship, June 2011.
Talent Development Award - Creative Scotland, March 2013.
Open Project Funding Award - Creative Scotland, July 2015.

Published work

Novels 
The Credit Draper (Two Ravens Press 2008, re-printed Five Leaves 2011, re-printed Saraband 2014)
The Liberation of Celia Kahn (Five Leaves 2011, reprinted Saraband 2014)
An Exquisite Sense of What is Beautiful (Saraband 2013)
The Land Agent (Saraband 2014)
A Woman of Integrity (Freight 2017, re-printed Saraband 2018)
The Responsibility of Love (BackPage Press 2021)

Short stories 
 The Lovebirds (Printed Matter 1993)
 Soundscapes (Printed Matter 1995)
 Maimonides (London Magazine 2000)
 The Custodian (Gutter Magazine 2011)
 Poland 1919 - Decisions, Decisions (Spilling Ink 2011)
 Poland 1919 - Palestine or America (Glasgow University Press 2012)
 The Coffee Kid (runner-up in the Poetic Republic Short Story Competition 2015)
 The Myth of Bert Slater (Nutmeg Magazine Issue, No 2, 2017)
 Remember From Where You Came (With Their Best Clothes On, New Writing Scotland 36, 2018)
 The Responsibility of Love (Lakeview International Journal of Literature and Arts, 2019)
 The White Place (New Writing Scotland 39, Aug. 2021)
 The Business of Carrying (Gutter Magazine, Aug, 2021)

Essays 
 Kibbutz - The Golden Years (appearing in Utopia, Five Leaves 2012)

References

External links 
Author's website
Publisher's website - Saraband
Publisher's website - Five Leaves
Review of The Credit Draper - The Jewish Chronicle
Review of The Liberation of Celia Kahn - Historical Novel Society
Review of An Exquisite Sense of What is Beautiful - Herald Scotland
Review of The Land Agent - The Edinburgh Reporter
Review of A Woman of Integrity - Herald Scotland
Review of The Responsibility of Love – Herald Scotland

1953 births
Living people
Scottish novelists
Scottish short story writers
Scottish Jewish writers
21st-century Scottish writers
21st-century British short story writers
People educated at Hutchesons' Grammar School
Alumni of the University of Glasgow
Scottish male novelists